Historisk Tidsskrift or  may refer to:

Historisk Tidsskrift (Denmark), a Danish historical journal
Historisk Tidsskrift (Norway), a Norwegian historical journal
Historisk Tidskrift, a Swedish historical journal with a slightly different spelling
Historisk Tidskrift för Finland, a Swedish-language Finnish historical journal